Dream Girl is an Indian 2019 Hindi-language comedy film directed by Raaj Shaandilyaa in his directorial debut and produced by Ekta Kapoor. The film focuses on a cross-gender actor (played by Ayushmann Khurrana) whose female voice impersonation begets attention from others, and talks about depression and loneliness. It also stars Nushrat Bharucha, Annu Kapoor, Manjot Singh, Vijay Raaz and Abhishek Banerjee.

Initially supposed to be titled Googly, it was renamed Dream Girl. The film was released on 13 September 2019 to a surprise blockbuster response and entered the 100 Crore Club. It was a critical and commercial blockbuster, grossing around 148 crore net in India and over  worldwide, becoming one of the highest-grossing Hindi films of 2019.

In August 2022, a spiritual sequel titled Dream Girl 2 entered production, set for release in June 2023. It stars an ensemble cast of Ayushmann Khurrana, Ananya Panday, Annu Kapoor, Paresh Rawal, Asrani, Rajpal Yadav, Vijay Raaz, Manjot Singh, Abhishek Banerjee and Seema Pahwa.

Plot 
 
Karamveer "Karam" Singh is good at impersonating the female voice from a very young age and hence keeps getting female lead roles in plays (Sita in Ramayan and Radha in Krishnaleela) since his childhood. Although he protests every time that would settle for a much smaller but male character, he is currently unemployed and performs these roles because they pay well. His friend Smiley runs a liquor shop and supports him in every one of his endeavors. His father, Jagjeet Singh runs a shop dealing in funeral items and is sunk deep into loans he owes to various banks. Due to low turnover, he is unable to pay back the EMI's.

While returning from an unsuccessful interview for a job, Karam sees an ad that promises Rs. 70,000/month salary. He reaches the given address, but the employer Mauji 'W Ji' rejects him outright without inquiring about his qualifications. Karamveer pleads, and finally, Mauji relents and shows him his call center where only ladies work. The call center is entertaining fantasies of people who call them, mostly men who don't have a partner in life. Karamveer is shocked but quickly regains his composure, and answers a call in a female voice for Ms. Pooja (who works at the call center), but is frequently on leave. Mauji is impressed with his skill and immediately hires him and gives him Rs. 25,000 as advance payment. Karamveer tells his father that he has got a job at an MNC and hands him the advance payment he received. His father is happy to receive this news, while Karam celebrates with his friend Smiley. Later at the job, he garners a good fan base because of his sweet voice and sharp presence of mind.

He comes across Mahi at his customer's home where he went to deliver products asked from his father's shop. He is smitten by her beauty and catches her attention with some witty lines. Later they come across each other while waiting in a queue, and Karam impresses her with his funny personality. Soon love blossoms between the two and they get engaged.

At his job, Karam comes across a few people who call him regularly: Toto, a spoilt brat; Rajpal, a policeman by profession who writes couplets; Roma, editor of a magazine; Karam's father Jagjeet and Mahi's brother,  Mahinder. Karam, initially unknown of their real identities, eventually, comes across them in his life and is surprised to know their identities. Eventually, everyone becomes obsessed with Pooja, impersonated by Karam, because of her sweet voice and friendly nature. They fall in love with Pooja and everyone wants to marry her.

Karam, frustrated with such unsolicited requests, wants to quit. His employer, Mauji rejects his resignation and blackmails him that he would expose his identity to his neighborhood, which might jeopardize his marriage. Karam decides to tell everything to Mahi but fizzles out when he realizes her brother Mahinder is also a fan of Pooja. He figures out that if he talks to his callers rudely, they would get along with their realities and stop calling him. This move backfires as everyone becomes more obsessed with Pooja, Toto attempts to commit suicide, and Rajpal threatens to abandon his wife.

Karamveer starts threatening these people to stay away from Pooja or otherwise face the consequences in an attempt to stop them from marrying Pooja.

In one such event, Karamveer as  Pooja tells Roma that she is in love with her boyfriend Anurag. Roma insists upon meeting Anurag to see if he is a good guy. Karamveer meets Roma at a mall posing as Anurag. After the meeting, he comes across Mahinder, shopping at the mall who overhears Roma and Karam and tells it to Mahi, also present at the mall. Roma, already sceptical of Karamveer alias Anurag's character, tells Mahi that Karam is engaged to Pooja when Mahi reveals that she is  Karam's fiancé, and his duplicity is exposed. Mahi, heartbroken, leaves the mall when Karamveer is unable to explain the situation to her. Confusion breaks out in the mall and Pooja's identity remains tumultuous.

Karam chases Mahi and takes her to his office and explains everything. Mauji misbehaves with Mahi and she slaps him in front of his staff. Karamveer defends Mahi and leaves the office, further enraging Mauji. Mahi reconciles with Karamveer.
Later, she attends the play where Karam is playing the role of Radha. At the end of the play, Rajpal arrives with Mauji who claims that Karam has killed Pooja. Karam recites one of Rajpal's couplet. Rajpal is taken aback since he shared the couplet with Pooja and nobody else.

Karam reveals that he has been impersonating Pooja all this time. This is followed by an emotional speech by Karam on growing loneliness amongst people. Roma comes with the real Pooja and exposes Mauji who is arrested by Rajpal.
Toto, Mahinder, Jagjeet, and Roma learn that Karam has been impersonating Pooja all along. Finally, Mahi agrees to marry Karam.

Cast
 Ayushmann Khurrana as Karamveer "Karam" Singh / Pooja: Jagjeet's son; Mahi's boyfriend-turned husband
 Nushrratt Bharuccha as Mahi Sing (nee Rajput): Karam's girlfriend-turned wife
 Annu Kapoor as Jagjeet Singh (Karam's father) / Rahul
 Manjot Singh as Smiley Singh: Karam's best friend
 Rajesh Sharma as Mauji a.k.a. Wji
 Vijay Raaz as Policeman Rajpal Kirar
 Abhishek Banerjee as Mahinder Rajput / Rafi
 Raj Bhansali as Chintu "Toto" Gurjar
 Neha Saraf as Chandrakanta Kirar: Rajpal's wife
 Vedika Bhandari as Pooja, the original call center employee who was replaced with Karam by Wji
 Nidhi Bisht as Roma Gupta
 Neela Mulherkar as Dadi.
 Riteish Deshmukh in song "Dhagala Lagali" (special appearance)

Production
In November 2018, Ayushman Khurrana announced Dream Girl to be written and directed by Raaj Shaandilyaa and produced by Ekta Kapoor, Shobha Kapoor and Aashish Singh. Nushrratt Bharuccha was cast opposite him. The lead character will have three accents in the film. Ahmed Khan is choreographing the dances with Khurrana in sari.

Principal photography began in December 2018. Bharucha completed her part of filming in January 2019 in Mumbai.

Release
The film was released theatrically on 13 September 2019. ZEE5 acquired digital rights and launched it online on 21 November 2019.

Reception

Critical response
Dream Girl received mixed response from critics, who criticised the "empty" and "jumbled-up" writing as well as the "tasteless" and "stale" humour, but praised the performances of the supporting cast.

Charu Thakur of India Today gave the film three stars out of five, noted that Dream Girl was an out-and-out comedy with witty one-liners and jokes, which made it a long comic skit sans a storyline. She concurred with Taran in praising performance of Khurrana and Kapoor. Criticising director for losing subject of the film she concluded, "However, his [Shaandilyaa's] hesitation to delve deeper into the subject makes it score less on the report card. If you are looking for a light-hearted comedy this weekend, [this film] should definitely be on your list."

Shubhra Gupta of The Indian Express gave two stars out of five and felt the film was had many good ideas but those were not executed,  stating, ".... these ideas remain half-baked, being mouthed strictly as meaningless dialogue for either laughs or claps". Praising Khurana for his performance, she concluded, "You stay watching Dream Girl for Khurrana. He plays Karam/Pooja with grace and conviction, and makes this thing sing." Priyanka Sinha Jha of News18, praising Khurrana and ensemble of Manjot Singh, Vijay Raaz, Annu Kapoor, Abhishek Banerjee, Nushrat Bharucha, Rajesh Sharma, Nidhi Bisht and Raj Bhansali for their performances, rates the film with three and half stars out of five. Agreeing with Gupta, she noted that the second half did suffer from lack of ingenuity. Praising writer-director Raaj Shaandilyaa for 'keeping the screenplay pithy, the dialogues glib and story on the tracks, she opined, "Dream Girl will surely entertain the film going audiences while sparking off an important conversation on gender constructs in Indian cinema." Writing for Film Companion, Baradwaj Rangan said "These are one-joke characters, and this is a one-joke movie. Very quickly, a sense of staleness sets in."

Box office
Dream Girl has the opening day collection of 10.05 crore, and second day collection of 16.42 crore, whereas the third day collection was 18.10 crore, taking its total opening weekend collection to 44.57 crore in India. On the fourth day the film crossed 50 crore and became Khurrana's fastest film to cross 50 crore until his next release, Bala. The film has become the eleventh highest-grossing Bollywood film of 2019.

, with a gross of 169.36 crore in India and 31.44 crore overseas, the film has grossed 200.80 crore worldwide.

Soundtrack 

The music of the film is composed by Meet Bros while lyrics are by Kumaar and Shabbir Ahmed. The song "Dhagala Lagali" was removed due to a copyright issue. All soundtracks listed below have their lyrics credited solely to Kumaar unless noted otherwise:

References
32) Dream Girl 2 Review  By Sanjay

External links
 
 Dream Girl on Bollywood Hungama
 

Balaji Motion Pictures films
2010s Hindi-language films
Cross-dressing in Indian films
2019 films
Films directed by Raaj Shaandilyaa